William Stanley McKenzie (11 December 1934 – 13 May 1974) was an Australian rules footballer who played with Richmond in the Victorian Football League (VFL).

Notes

External links 

1934 births
1974 deaths
Australian rules footballers from Victoria (Australia)
Richmond Football Club players